The Toshiba T1000 is a discontinued laptop computer manufactured by the Toshiba Corporation in 1987. It has a similar specification to the IBM PC Convertible, with a 4.77 MHz 80C88 processor, 512 KB of RAM, and a monochrome CGA-compatible LCD. Unlike the Convertible, it includes a standard serial port and parallel port, connectors for an external monitor, and a real-time clock.

Unusually for an IBM compatible PC, the T1000 contains a 256 KB ROM with a copy of MS-DOS 2.11. This acts as a small, read-only hard drive. Alternative operating systems can still be loaded from the floppy drive, or (if present) the RAM disk.

Along with the T1200 and earlier T1100, the Toshiba T1000 was one of the early computers to feature a "laptop" form factor and battery-powered operation.

Reception
PC Magazine in 1988 named the Toshiba T1000 an "Editor's Choice" among 12 tested portable computers. One reviewer called it "the first real DOS laptop" and a plausible replacement for his Tandy 200, while another praised its durability after 60,000 miles of traveling and "incredible bargain" $800 street price. BYTE in 1989 listed the T1000 as among the "Excellence" winners of the BYTE Awards, stating that it "takes portability to the limit ... as self-contained as you can get and still have a real computer that can handle real-world workloads." Noting that it was available for as little as $850, the magazine reported that "Many of us are in love with this one." In the same issue, Jerry Pournelle praised it as a "little gem". While acknowledging that it cost more than the TRS-80 Model 100 and NEC PC-8201, he believed that "you get quite a lot for the added weight and price", and reported that "Many writers swear by the T1000. David Drake loves his."

Specification

Software Compatibility 
Compatible with software written for the IBM PC/XT using a color graphics adapter (CGA) display

Interfaces 
 RGB (CGA) color video port
 Composite B&W monochrome video port
 RS-232-C serial port
 Parallel printer port
 Numeric keypad port
 External diskette drive port
 Toshiba proprietary memory slot
 Toshiba proprietary modem slot - "B" form factor

See also 

 Toshiba T1000LE
 Toshiba T1100
 Toshiba T1200
 Toshiba T3100

Notes 
The laptop's battery pack must be charged and working for the laptop to power on.

References

 
 
 Toshiba Corporation, T1000 Portable Personal Computer User's Manual, 1987
 

IBM PC compatibles
T1000